Materna is a Polish coat of arms. It was used by one szlachta family in the times of the Polish–Lithuanian Commonwealth.

See also
 Heraldry
 Polish heraldry
 List of Polish nobility coats of arms 
 Ślepowron coat of arms
 Korwin coat of arms

Sources 
 Dynastic Genealogy 
 Ornatowski.com 
 Słownik genealogiczny - leksykon

References 

Polish coats of arms